Valter Heil (born 11 February 1990) is a Romanian footballer who plays as a centre back for Kazincbarcikai SC.

He started his career at Olimpia Satu Mare. In 2012, he joined FC Vaslui. He made his Liga I debut on 4 May 2013 in a match against Universitatea Cluj. He was later loaned to ASA Târgu Mureș.

References

External links
 Player profile on Liga1.ro
 

1990 births
Living people
Sportspeople from Satu Mare
Romanian footballers
Liga II players
FC Olimpia Satu Mare players
CSU Voința Sibiu players
Liga I players
FC Vaslui players
Kazincbarcikai SC footballers
Romanian expatriate footballers
Expatriate footballers in Hungary
Romanian expatriate sportspeople in Hungary
Association football central defenders